Mark O'Neill (born 19 June 1975) is an Australian former professional rugby league footballer who played in the 1990s and 2000s. He played in Australia for the Balmain Tigers, then the Wests Tigers following the joint venture of Balmain and the Western Suburbs Magpies, and in England for the Leeds Rhinos and the Hull Kingston Rovers in the Super League.

Biography
O'Neill was born in Paddington, New South Wales, Australia on 19 June 1975.

Playing career
A staunch and durable player, O'Neill was a member of the Tigers, in both their forms, for twelve seasons.

He was a local Balmain junior who played at the Dundas Shamrocks and North Ryde Hawks clubs.

O'Neill played his 200th NRL match against the Sydney Roosters at Campbelltown Stadium in Round 16, 2004, but the milestone match would not be remembered for the right reasons as the Tigers lost by 56–0.

Three weeks later, he was on the receiving end of a serious case of foul-play in 2004 when Danny Williams of the Melbourne Storm punched O'Neill in the face in an off the ball incident. Williams received an 18-match ban.

In 2005 he was voted team captain, a title Scott Prince took over during O'Neill's twelve weeks absence with an elbow injury. Controversially, coach Tim Sheens retained Prince as captain on O'Neill's return to the team. He went on to play at second-row forward in the Tigers 2005 NRL Grand Final win over the North Queensland Cowboys.

At the end of the 2005 season, O'Neill moved to England and Leeds Rhinos. His season at Leeds was marred by injury. A pre-season friendly resulted in a shoulder injury which sidelined him for four months and a leg muscle tear resulted in six weeks off the field. O'Neill's contract at Leeds was not renewed and he spent 2007 at Hull Kingston Rovers where he played his final year in professional rugby league before retiring.

Post-playing career
In February 2008, O'Neill was appointed to the NRL's Match Review Committee. The committee scans match videos for incidents of foul play.

In 2016, O'Neill worked at his former club the Wests Tigers as football manager but later resigned after alleged misconduct.

He also worked for Sky News as a rugby league analyst.

In October 2018, O'Neill was appointed as general manager of football at the Parramatta Eels.

Career highlights 
First Grade Debut: 1994 – Round 19, Balmain v St George, Leichhardt Oval, Sydney, 6 August.
Premierships: 2005 – Wests Tigers defeated North Queensland Cowboys 30 - 16 in the Grand Final, Stadium Australia, Sydney, 2 October.
Wests Tigers Club Captain: 2005

Footnotes

External links 
(archived by web.archive.org) Profile at leedsrugby

1975 births
Living people
Australian Institute of Business alumni
Australian rugby league commentators
Australian rugby league players
Balmain Tigers players
Hull Kingston Rovers players
Leeds Rhinos players
Rugby league locks
Rugby league players from Sydney
Rugby league second-rows
Sportsmen from New South Wales
Wests Tigers captains
Wests Tigers players